Elections to Scottish Borders Council were held on 3 May 2007, the same day as the other Scottish local government elections and the Scottish Parliament general election. The election was the first one using 11 new wards created as a result of the Local Governance (Scotland) Act 2004, each ward will elect three or four councillors using the single transferable vote system form of proportional representation. The new wards replace 34 single-member wards which used the plurality (first past the post) system of election.

Election results

Ward results

Changes after the elections
†Tom Weatherston ceased to be an Independent and joined the Conservatives on 17 January 2011

2007
2007 Scottish local elections